Herpetopoma benthicola is a species of sea snail, a marine gastropod mollusc in the family Chilodontidae.

Description
The height of the small, conic shell attains 3.5 mm.

Distribution 
This species occurs in New Zealand.

References

benthicola
Gastropods described in 1937